Pa Qaleh (also Romanized as Pā Qal‘eh) is a village in Hojr Rural District, in the Central District of Sahneh County, Kermanshah Province, Iran. At the 2006 census, its population was 189, in 42 families.

References 

Populated places in Sahneh County